David Valdez (born 6 April 1993) is an Argentine professional footballer who plays as a midfielder for Club Atlético Mitre.

Career
Valdez started with Atlético Tucumán in 2013, making his debut on 18 May in a Primera B Nacional match against Instituto. He went onto make twenty-eight further appearances during the next three Primera B Nacional campaigns, with the last of those three ending in promotion to the 2016 Argentine Primera División. Valdez joined Torneo Federal A side San Jorge in September 2018.

Career statistics
.

Honours
Atlético Tucumán
Primera B Nacional: 2015

References

External links

1993 births
Living people
Sportspeople from San Miguel de Tucumán
Argentine footballers
Association football midfielders
Primera Nacional players
Argentine Primera División players
Torneo Federal A players
Atlético Tucumán footballers
San Jorge de Tucumán footballers
Club Atlético Mitre footballers